The Diocese of Bluefields is a Latin Church ecclesiastical jurisdiction or diocese of the Catholic Church in Nicaragua.  The Vicariate Apostolic of Bluefields had been erected on December 2, 1913 and had grown to approximately 587,000 Catholics by 2017.  On November 30, 2017 the Vicariate Apostolic of Bluefields was elevated to a diocese and a second diocese (the Diocese of Siuna) was created, taking approximately 60% of the Catholics that had formerly been in the Vicariate Apostolic of Bluefields.  The current bishop is Francisco José Tigerino Dávila .

History 
 February 12, 1913: Established as Vicariate Apostolic of Bluefields, on territory split off from the Diocese of León in Nicaragua.
 November 30, 2017: Lost territory to establish the Diocese of Siuna.
 November 30, 2017: Elevated as to the status of diocese.

Ordinaries
Agustín José Bernaus y Serra, O.F.M. Cap. (1913–1930)
Juan Solá y Farrell, O.F.M. Cap. (1931–1942)
Matteo Aloisio Niedhammer y Yaeckle, O.F.M. Cap. (1943–1970)
Salvador Albert Schlaefer Berg, O.F.M. Cap. (1970–1993)
Pablo Ervin Schmitz Simon, O.F.M. Cap. (1994–2020)
Francisco José Tigerino Dávila (2020– )

Auxiliary bishops
Pablo Ervin Schmitz Simon, O.F.M. Cap. (1984-1994), appointed Vicar Apostolic here
David Albin Zywiec Sidor, O.F.M. Cap. (2002–2017)

See also
Roman Catholic dioceses of Nicaragua

External links

Roman Catholic dioceses in Nicaragua
Christian organizations established in 1913
Roman Catholic dioceses and prelatures established in the 20th century
1913 establishments in Nicaragua